Shomal University was founded in 1995 and is the biggest private university in Iran.

History
Shomal University was founded in 1995 and is the biggest private university in Iran. At present the university caters to over 7000 students in 30 different fields of study for undergraduate, graduate and doctorate degrees.

Shomal University at a glance

	
Shomal University was founded in 1995 and is the biggest non-governmental university in Iran, fully accredited by the Ministry of Science, Research, and Technology. Through the National University Entrance Exam conducted by the Ministry of Science, Research, and Technology, 124 students were accepted to attend undergraduate courses in the fields of accountancy and computer engineering from the academic year 1995–1996.

At present the university caters to over 7500 students in 35 different courses at undergraduate and graduate levels.

The original university was located in the city of Amol. In 1997 the university moved to a larger building as the number of students and courses increased. During the first academic year the educational activities were conducted in the building located at 17 Shahrivar Square. With the advancement of educational activities in 1998, the classes were transferred again to the Ma'arfat educational complex building, situated at 26 Talib Amoli Street, Amol.

At Imamzadeh Abdullah Junction ( out of Amol), in 2000, the master plan for the Pardis university campus was designed, and on forested, hilly terrain overlooking the Haraz River and backgrounded by the Alborz mountain range,  construction work started.

In 2002, construction for a guest house, main office building and physical education complex building were completed and commissioned. In 2003, more classes, workshops and laboratory space were added. In 2005 construction began on a new, modern Communications and Information Technology building.

Registration
Shomal University is under the Higher Education system of the Ministry of Science, Research and Technology, and every year registration and admission of the students in all fields is through acceptance in the National  University Entrance examination.

Teachers are evaluated every term, using the same method as other universities in the country.

The university also considers special concessions to students who have top grades in university entrance exams, Olympic award holders in any field, and award winners of student scientific competitions and sports etc.

According to ministry notification, 10% of the top graduates of the university will be accepted to graduate or undergraduate courses without undertaking the National University Entrance exam.

Faculties and departments

Faculty of Physical Education and Sport Science

Faculty of Engineering and Technology

The Faculty of Engineering and Technology was one of the first faculties of Shomal University, Amol (SUA) and conducts courses (undergraduate and graduate) in all engineering fields.  In 1996, the faculty started with only undergraduate computer engineering and acceptance to this was on condition of passing the National University Entrance Exam conducted by the Ministry of Science, Research and Technology.  Further courses are now offered in the fields of civil engineering, communications, electrical engineering, industrial engineering and architecture.  As demand requires, new courses are constantly being offered and registration increases each year.
 Architecture
 Basic science
 Chemical engineering
 Civil engineering
 Computer engineering
 Electrical & electronic engineering
 Food science
 Industrial engineering
 Mechanical engineering
 Natural resources engineering

SUA is a progressive institution having great ties with the national industry. Their expectations are that our students be taught current and prospective courses throughout the academic sessions with high standard of education by excellent and outstanding professors and academic staff.

Faculty of Humanities and Social Science
The students are admitted to this faculty and other affiliated faculties through the entrance exam conducted by Ministry of Science, Research and Technology. The affiliated faculties are:
 Accounting
 General
 Law
 Management

Amard Building

This is the office building of Shomal University known as "Paradise Daneshgahi Shomal."

TOEFL testing
Shomal University provides the internet-based TOEFL exams (IBT).

Electronic campus (e-campus)
SUA is fully equipped with the latest electronic equipment and computer facilities, and mechanized system of computerized general service. Students issued the Smartcard can use all university facilities - digital and internet. Some of these are:
 Computerized Educational Services - students' registration system
 Electronic learning (webpage text learning)
 Digital library
 Management Information System (MIS) and automation of administration
 All students' services (welfare, educational)
 Connection with high-speed internet service
 Direct internet connection with SUA for the students staying in the city

Central Library
 Shomal University Digital Library

References

External links
 Shomal University official website
 Wikipedia Farsi page
 123University

Universities in Iran
Education in Mazandaran Province
Buildings and structures in Mazandaran Province
Amol County